Nicolae Gheorghe (12 November 1946 –  8 August 2013) was a Romanian human rights activist.

Biography
The founder of the Roma modern movement, starting in Romania during the communist regime and continued it to his last moment. 
He attended military academy. In 1972, he graduated in philosophy and sociology. In 1974, he studied minorities for the government.
After 1989, he was appointed an expert on minorities, for the Romanian government.

He was an activist for Roma rights.
In 1993, he founded the Centre for Social Intervention and Studies.
In 1998 to 1999, he helped establish the Working Group of Roma Associations.

Works

References

External links
"In search of a new deal for Roma: ERRC interview with Nicolae Gheorghe", European Roma Rights Centre, 7 November 2001
ODIHR Director saddened by death of Nicolae Gheorghe, architect of OSCE work on Roma issues, Office for Democratic Institutions and Human Rights, 9 August 2013 
"Nicolae Gheorghe", European Roma Cultural Foundation 

 Interview with Nicolae Gheorge. 

Romanian human rights activists
People from Roșiorii de Vede
1946 births
2013 deaths